Xanthorhoe bulbulata is a species of moth in the family Geometridae. It is endemic to New Zealand. It is classified as critically endangered by the Department of Conservation.

Taxonomy 
X. bulbulata was first described by Achille Guenée in 1868. In 1883 Edward Meyrick placed the species within the genus Larentia. In 1898 George Vernon Hudson assigned the species to the genus Xanthorhoe. L. B. Prout, in 1939, again placed this species within the genus Larentia. In 1971 J. S. Dugdale disagreed with the placement and included this species within the genus Helastia. However this was not agreed with by R. C. Craw and in 1987 he placed the species within the genus Xanthorhoe. In 1988 Dugdale agreed with Craw's placement. The female holotype specimen is found at the Natural History Museum, London.

Original description 
Guenée described the species as follows:

Distribution and habitat 
This species is endemic to New Zealand. Historically this moth was distributed throughout much of the South Island  with records obtained from as far north as Awapiri in the Awatere valley down to Invercargill. The moths could be found in "open, grassy places" from sea level to elevations of 660-930m. Records suggest that the moth was once "common" between September and March.

Species decline 
Despite having been common in New Zealand up to the 1930s, since 1 January 1940 there have been only two recorded collections of X. bulbulata. These were a male found flying during the day in Queenstown in 1979 and a female caught in a light trap between February and March 1991 at the Eastern entrance to the Kawarau Gorge. Intensive sampling for this moth covering 285 sites between 1995 and 2000 returned no specimens.

It is thought that the documented decline in this species is the result of ecological changes to habitats following European settlement.

Conservation status 
This species has the "Nationally Critical" conservation status under the New Zealand Threat Classification System. This species is feared extinct.

References 

Xanthorhoe
Moths of New Zealand
Endemic fauna of New Zealand
Moths described in 1868
Taxa named by Achille Guenée
Endangered biota of New Zealand
Endemic moths of New Zealand